Mohammad Abu Ishaque Ibrahim is a retired Major General of Bangladesh Army. He served as the Director General of Bangladesh Rifles from 12 July 2001 to 1 December 2001.

Career 
Abu Ishaque Ibrahim was the battalion commander of the cadet battalion and commander of the Bogra division. Who was later promoted to the rank of Major General through periodic promotions. He served as the Director General of Bangladesh Rifles from 12 July 2001 to 1 December 2001. He retired on January 21, 2002.

References 

Director Generals of Border Guards Bangladesh
Bangladesh Army generals
Bangladeshi military personnel